The Swimming Tournament at the 1979 Pan American Games took place in the Piscina Olimpica del Escambron in San Juan, Puerto Rico from July 2 to July 8, 1979.

Three world records were broken at this edition of the Games, all by U.S. swimmers.

Men’s events

Women's events

Medal table

References
 Hickoksports
Results
Folha Online
USA Swimming

 
1979 Pan American Games
Swimming at the Pan American Games
Pan American Games